Sally Taylor may refer to:

 Sally Taylor (singer-songwriter) (born 1974), American singer-songwriter and advocate for the victims of land mines
 Sally Taylor (TV presenter), British news presenter, long-serving on south of England regional news for the BBC
 Sally Taylor-Isherwood, Canadian actress